Griffith Lake is a small lake and campsite located in the towns of Peru and Mount Tabor, Vermont, in the Green Mountain National Forest.  The site lies on the Long Trail/Appalachian Trail.  The area is maintained  by the Green Mountain Club and has an on-site caretaker to maintain the tent sites, outhouse, composting toilets, and trails during the peak season.  During that time, there is a $5 charge for the overnight use of the tent platforms and nearby lean-to shelter.  As there are no 'safe' water sources, hikers should be prepared to use a camping-grade water purification system, or to boil their water.

Access to Griffith lake is through a combination walking/snowmobile trail.  Horses, motorized vehicles, and mountain bikes are not permitted on the access trail.

External links
Forest Service Griffith Lake Info

Lakes of Vermont
Mount Tabor, Vermont
Peru, Vermont
Bodies of water of Bennington County, Vermont
Tourist attractions in Bennington County, Vermont